Helvete (Swedish for "hell") is an album by Swedish grindcore band Nasum, released in 2003. 

Mitch Harris (Napalm Death) made a live music video for the song "Scoop". This video can be found on Nasum's website. Shane Embury from Napalm Death plays bass guitar on "Drop Dead" and "Whip".

In February 2009, Helvete was ranked number 2 in Terrorizers list of essential European grindcore albums, with writer Olivier 'Zoltar' Badin describing it as "confirming Nasum as the undisputed kings of the new wave of Swedish grindcore".

Track listing

References

Nasum albums
Relapse Records albums
2003 albums